Serinibacter is a Gram-positive, non-spore-forming and non-motile genus of bacteria from the family of Beutenbergiaceae.

References

Micrococcales
Bacteria genera